Pierces Creek is a rural locality in the Toowoomba Region, Queensland, Australia. It was formerly known as Virginia.

History 
The locality was originally named Pierce Creek but it was renamed Pierces Creek in 2005. It appears on a 1944 map as Virginia.

Virginia Provisional School opened on 12 October 1908 and became Virginia State School in 1909. In 1918 it was renamed Pierce Creek State School. It closed on 18 October 1959. It was on the western side of Pierces Creek Road south of the junction with Middle Road.

St Faith's Anglican Church in Pechey was dedicated on 10 September 1911 by the Venerable Archdeacon Arthur Rivers. In February 1931 it was relocated to Virginia (now Pierces Creek), where it was re-dedicated on 1 March 1930 by Archdeacon Glover. It was on the western side of Pierces Creek Road near the junction with Middle Road. 

References 

Toowoomba Region
Localities in Queensland